Zeng Sheng (19 December 1910 – 20 November 1995), born Zeng Zhensheng, was a Chinese military officer and politician. His name is also spelt as Tsang Sang, Tsang Shang, Jung Sung and Chung Sung in various sources. Tsang is best known for commanding a guerilla force operating in Hong Kong and Guangdong during World War II.

Tsang was born to Hakka parents in Guangdong province in a village which was then in Huiyang (Fuiyong) and is now a suburb of Shenzhen. His father had been a sailor before jumping ship in Australia and operated a grocery store in Sydney. Tsang Sang attended primary school in Huiyang and Hong Kong, before moving to Sydney to join his father in 1923. Tsang attended Fort Street High School, but returned to China with his father in 1928 to complete his secondary education at the affiliated high school of Sun Yat-sen University in Guangzhou (Canton). He entered Sun Yat-sen University in 1933, where he joined a student organisation affiliated with the Chinese Communist Party and became active in student politics. Trouble with the authorities led him to move to Hong Kong in 1936, where he briefly worked as a school teacher and on the ocean liner RMS Empress of Japan, before resuming his studies at the end of the year.

Tsang joined the Chinese Communist Party in 1936 and was given responsibility for political organisation amongst Hong Kong-based sailors, becoming secretary of the Hong Kong seamen's trade union in 1937. In 1938, after the Imperial Japanese Army began an offensive in Guangdong, Tsang asked to return to China to organise a guerilla resistance force. The local resistance force in Huiyang commanded by Tsang was later combined with other forces to form the East River Column, which operated in Guangdong and Hong Kong during World War II with Tsang as its commander. Although Tsang's force had been formed with the assistance of the Kuomintang-led regular army and co-operated with Allied operations (including the rescue of British prisoners-of-war and downed Allied airmen and assisting with MI9 operations in the New Territories), because of its Communist Party political affiliation it also experienced a number of armed conflicts with Kuomintang-affiliated regulars.

At the end of the war, the guerilla force participated in the renewed Chinese Civil War on the Communist side. After the Communist victory in the civil war, Tsang was made a major general in the People's Liberation Army in 1955, and played an instrumental role in the development of the South Sea Fleet of the PLA's naval force.

He became mayor of Guangzhou in 1960 and deputy governor of Guangdong province. He was jailed during the Cultural Revolution, but was released in 1974 and became vice-minister of transport, then Transport Minister. Tsang died in 1995 in Guangzhou.

References

1910 births
1995 deaths
Chinese military personnel of World War II
Chinese Communist Party politicians from Guangdong
Hakka generals
People educated at Fort Street High School
Chinese emigrants to Australia
Mayors of Guangzhou
People from Huiyang
Politicians from Huizhou